Michael I. Kotlikoff is an American researcher, academic leader, and veterinarian, who is currently the Provost of Cornell University.  He has been continuously funded by the NIH since 1986, and made significant contributions to muscle biology, heart repair, and mouse genetics.

Biography
Born to a Jewish family, Kotlikoff received his BA degree from the University of Pennsylvania magna cum laude in literature, and his doctorate of veterinary medicine (VMD) summa cum laude from the University of Pennsylvania. He then pursued research training earning a Ph.D. degree in Physiology at the University of California, Davis in 1994, before returning for postdoctoral training at the University of Pennsylvania in the Veterinary and Medical schools.  He was a faculty member at Penn, appointed in the Veterinary and Medical Schools from 1985 to 2000, and chaired the Department of Animal Biology at Penn from 1996 to 2000, while also serving as Director of the Center for Animal Transgenesis and Germ Cell Research from 1998-2000.

In 2000, he was recruited to Cornell University to chair the newly formed Department of Biomedical Sciences, and to chair the Mammalian Genomics Initiative. As chair, Kotlikoff markedly expanded departmental research, oversaw the university's strategy to develop core mouse facilities, and established and oversaw the university transgenesis facility. In 2007, Kotlikoff was appointed dean of the Cornell University College of Veterinary Medicine, and in 2015, he was appointed Cornell's 16th Provost. Following the death of President Elizabeth Garrett, Kotlikoff served as acting President of Cornell for several months, until the appointment of Hunter Rawlings as interim President.

Kotlikoff's laboratory works on cardiovascular biology and heart repair, and he leads a National Heart Lung and Blood Resource (the Cornell Heart, Lung, Blood Resource for Optogenetic Mouse Signaling) developing combinatorial mouse resources for in vivo biology.  His laboratory reported development of the first mouse strain expressing genetically encoded Ca2+ sensing molecules and the first in vivo recording of heart cell Ca2+ signaling. In 2007, Kotlikoff's lab demonstrated the limited lineage potential of c-kit+ heart cells using a mouse line they developed expressing green fluorescent proteins in c-kit+ cells. This finding contradicted claims that c-kit+ precursor cells in the heart can act as heart stem cells after injury or isolation and transplantation. Numerous subsequent studies have confirmed these findings.  In 2012 they showed that neonatal mammalian heart cells do have the potential to support neomyogenesis following heart infarction shortly after birth.

References 

University of Pennsylvania alumni
University of California, Davis alumni
Living people
American veterinarians
Male veterinarians
Cornell University faculty
University of Pennsylvania faculty
University of Pennsylvania School of Veterinary Medicine alumni
Year of birth missing (living people)